Alcohol 120% is a disk image emulator created by Alcohol Soft. It can create and mount disc images in the proprietary Media Descriptor File format. Images in this format consist of a pair of .mds and .mdf files. Alcohol 120% can also convert image files to the ISO format. Alcohol Soft has cited it will not be developing an image editor for Alcohol 120%.

The latest versions of Alcohol 120% comes with "Alcohol Cloaking Initiative for DRM" (A.C.I.D), which hides emulated drives from SecuROM 7 and SafeDisc 4.

Features

Alcohol 120%'s image making tool supports the following formats:

Media Descriptor File (default), consisting of a pair of .mds and .mdf
ISO image (.iso)

Furthermore, Alcohol 120% can mount the following images:

CloneCD image, consisting of a trio of .ccd, .img, and .sub files
Raw images, consisting of a pair of .bin and .cue files

Alcohol 120%'s image recording feature is capable of bypassing certain copy protection schemes, such as SafeDisc, SecuROM, and Data Position Measurement (DPM). However, certain copy protection schemes require burner hardware that is capable of reproducing the copy protection. It can also create images of PlayStation and PlayStation 2 file systems. It lacks the ability to back up DVD titles encrypted with the Content Scramble System. Due to legal restrictions, Alcohol Soft has opted not to include this feature.

Some software manufacturers employ software blacklisting methods to prevent Alcohol 120% from copying their discs. Initially, users had to use third party tools to counteract the blacklisting, such as Anti-blaxx, CureROM, and Y.A.S.U. Later, Alcohol 120% included its own "Alcohol Cloaking Initiative for DRM" (A.C.I.D) component.

Other editions 

 Alcohol 52% is a version of Alcohol 120% without the burning engine. It can still create image files, and mount those images on up to 31 virtual drives. There are two versions of Alcohol 52%, free and 30-day trial. The free version contains an optional adware toolbar bundled and is limited to 6 virtual drives.
 Alcohol 68% is a version of Alcohol 120% without media emulation capabilities, providing only the CD/DVD burning functions. It has since been discontinued and integrated into Alcohol 120%.
 Alcohol 120% Free Edition is a free for non-commercial use version of Alcohol 120% with certain limitations. These include only being able to burn to one drive at a time, only using up to two virtual drives and no copy protection emulation options.
 Alcohol 120% Retro Edition is a free version only for personal use on Windows 95/98/Me/XP (it cannot be run on Vista or later), allowing retrogamers to mount image files when using PCem or VMWare Workstation (DOSBox Pure cannot run it, because doing so will no doubt cause a crash). Li Wen'en (李文恩) talked about the issue with the developers, however, because many early programming tools were lost, the debugging becomes very difficult, causing the problem may be quite time-consuming to fix or even be postponed

Awards
European ShareWare Conference 2006 Epsilon Award

See also
Comparison of ISO image software
SCSI Pass-Through Direct (SPTD)

References

External links

Alcohol 52% Free Edition

Windows-only software
Optical disc authoring software
Disk image emulators
Windows CD/DVD writing software